Red Dog Airport  is a private-use airport located at Red Dog Mine, in the U.S. state of Alaska. The airport is privately owned by the NANA (Northwest Arctic Native Association) Regional Corporation. It has one asphalt paved runway designated 2/20 which measures 6,312 x 100 ft. (1,924 x 30 m).

As per Federal Aviation Administration records, this airport had 7,968 passenger boardings (enplanements) in calendar year 2005 and 8,475 enplanements (105 scheduled + 8,370 unscheduled) in 2006.

Although most U.S. airports use the same three-letter location identifier for the FAA and IATA, Red Dog Airport is assigned DGG by the FAA and RDB by the IATA. The airport's ICAO identifier was changed from PARD to PADG.

References

External links
 Aviation Photos: Red Dog Airport (RDB) at Airliners.net
 Resources for this airport:
 
 
 
 

Defunct airports in Alaska
Airports in Northwest Arctic Borough, Alaska
Airports in the Arctic
Native American airports
Privately owned airports